Olea is a genus of mollusks belonging to the family Limapontiidae.

The species of this genus are found in Europe and Northern America.

Species:
 Olea hansineensis Agersborg, 1923 
 Olea hensoni Filho, Paulay & Krug, 2019

References

Limapontiidae
Gastropod genera